The 1981 Limerick Senior Hurling Championship was the 87th staging of the Limerick Senior Hurling Championship since its establishment by the Limerick County Board.

Killeedy were the defending champions.

South Liberties won the championship after a 4-07 to 2-11 defeat of Kilmallock in the final. It was their seventh championship title overall and their first title in three years. It remains their last championship triumph.

References

Limerick Senior Hurling Championship
Limerick Senior Hurling Championship